Georgi Avramov (born 5 October 1983) is a Bulgarian footballer who plays as a midfielder.

Career
Avramov began his career with Botev Plovdiv and graduated to their first team at the age of 18 during the 2002–03 season. On 17 May 2003, he made his league debut in a match against CSKA Sofia. Avramov substituted Georgi Andonov in the first half and played for 69 minutes. The result of the match was a 0–2 loss for Botev. On April 10, 2005, Avramov scored his first goal against Chernomorets Burgas in a match from the Bulgarian second division. He scored in the 47th minute. In the mid-2009 Avramov signed with Spartak Plovdiv.

References

1983 births
Living people
Bulgarian footballers
Botev Plovdiv players
FC Spartak Plovdiv players
PFC Cherno More Varna players
FC Montana players
First Professional Football League (Bulgaria) players

Association football midfielders